The seifu is a cocktail containing vodka, club soda and grapefruit juice.

History 
The seifu originated in upscale Manhattan bars, but has expanded in popularity to local bars and pubs throughout New York and the Midwest. The seifu is renowned for its comfortable taste and low calories.

Preparation and serving 
The ingredients are poured into a glass and garnished with a lime. In some instances when grapefruit juice is unavailable, pineapple juice and a shot of Wild Turkey Honey may be used in its place.

Ingredients 
 1 part vodka (preferably Ketel One)
 1 part club soda
 Splash of grapefruit juice

References 

Cocktails with vodka